The 2000 Tour de France was the 87th edition of Tour de France, one of cycling's Grand Tours. The Tour began in Futuroscope with a prologue individual time trial on 1 July and Stage 12 occurred on 13 July with a mountainous stage from Carpentras. The race finished on the Champs-Élysées in Paris on 23 July.

Stage 12
13 July 2000 — Carpentras to Mont Ventoux,

Stage 13
14 July 2000 — Avignon to Draguignan,

Stage 14
15 July 2000 — Draguignan to Briançon,

Stage 15
16 July 2000 — Briançon to Courchevel,

Stage 16
18 July 2000 — Courchevel to Morzine,

Stage 17
19 July 2000 — Évian-les-Bains to Lausanne,

Stage 18
20 July 2000 — Lausanne to Freiburg (Germany),

Stage 19
21 July 2000 — Freiburg (Germany) to Mulhouse,  (individual time trial)

Stage 20
22 July 2000 — Belfort to Troyes,

Stage 21
23 July 2000 — Paris (Eiffel Tower) to Paris (Champs-Élysées),

References

2000 Tour de France
Tour de France stages